Blumeriella kerriae is a species of fungus in the family Dermateaceae.

Since 2014, the Royal Horticultural Society in the UK has received reports from gardeners and horticulturalists of damage to plants of the shrub Kerria japonica. Symptoms include multiple red spots on leaves and lesions on the stems, resulting in defoliation and eventual death. It has been determined that this infection is caused by the fungus Blumeriella kerriae, which is specific to the Kerria. This highly contagious disease, known in English as Kerria twig and leaf blight, was known in the U.S. but had not previously been observed on British plants. It is regarded as a serious threat to the cultivated Kerria plants, which are popular garden shrubs.

References

Dermateaceae